The forest canary (Crithagra scotops) is a species of finch in the family Fringillidae.
It is found in South Africa and Eswatini.
Its natural habitats are subtropical or tropical moist lowland forest and subtropical or tropical moist montane forest.

The forest canary was formerly placed in the genus Serinus but phylogenetic analysis using mitochondrial and nuclear DNA sequences found that the genus was polyphyletic. The genus was therefore split and a number of species including the forest canary were moved to the resurrected genus Crithagra.

References

External links
 Forest canary - Species text in The Atlas of Southern African Birds.

forest canary
Birds of Southern Africa
forest canary
Taxonomy articles created by Polbot